Balssipotamon is a genus of freshwater crabs, found in Vietnam.  Data are deficient concerning their IUCN Red List of Threatened Species status, but B. fruehstorferi is considered to be vulnerable.

Species
 Balssipotamon fruehstorferi (Balss, 1914)
 Balssipotamon ungulatum (Dang & Hô, 2003)

References

External links

Potamoidea
Freshwater crustaceans of Asia